Douriez is a commune in the Pas-de-Calais department in the Hauts-de-France region of France.

Geography
A rural village situated some 30 miles (48 km) southeast of Montreuil-sur-Mer on the D119 road, by the banks of the river Authie, the border with the Somme department.

Places of interest
 The sixteenth-century church of the Nativité-de-Notre-Dame
 Remains of a 13th-century château
 A water mill
 Douriez Church
 Chateau Valloires
 Douries Chateau (Manoir)
 l'Estaminet Restaurant
 Douriez part and one of the seven valleys of nature
 Douriez the home of Baron & Baroness Guibal
 l'Auberge du gros tilleul (the best ***** )

Population

See also
Communes of the Pas-de-Calais department

References

Communes of Pas-de-Calais